Ajayan is an Indian surname, and may refer to

Ajayan (director), director of the Indian film Perumthachan
Pulickel Ajayan, nanotechnologist and professor of materials science
T. R. Ajayan, Indian literary and music critic
Krishnan Nair Ajayan, Indian footballer
 Ajayan River, a river on Guam
 Ajayan Bay, a bay on Guam

Indian surnames